Charles Winton Steele (July 24, 1858 – March 22, 1943) was an American lawyer and politician who served as a member of the Virginia Senate.

References

External links
 

1858 births
1943 deaths
Democratic Party Virginia state senators
19th-century American politicians
20th-century American politicians